Semra is a village in Ghazipur district.  Rampur village is located across the Ganges opposite Semra. Both these villages are jointly called Rampur-Semra by the locals. Semra village comes under Sherpur gram panchayat of Mohammadabad tehsil.  The population of this village is around 5500 while the number of voters is 3800.

Geographic location 

Semra is a part of Sherpur Gram Panchayat. In practice, Shiva Rai's Pura and Chhanbaiya are also part of Semra.The village is situated on the banks of the Ganges and has been badly plagued by Ganga Katan for over two decades. As a result of this erosion, 80 percent of Shiva Rai's entire population and 50 percent of Semra's have been absorbed into the Ganges.

Agriculture 

The Semra village is good in aspects of Agriculture. The Land of the village is fertile and water level is not deeper than 100 foot. The farmers of the village also have good information about the farming and new tools and Technology related to it. Machinery like tractors, combine harvesters are mostly used in the village for agriculture. Fish farming, cattle rearing, and poultry farming are also done in the village. Commercial activities are also done in the village. One of the common problems of the farmers of the village is flooding because the village is located on the banks of Ganga River and also suffers flood some times. The village is located almost 30 ft above the average water flow of Ganges.

References

Villages in Ghazipur district